WAHS is a radio station licensed to Auburn Hills, Michigan, United States.

WAHS may refer to:

Schools
 Warren Area High School, Warren, Pennsylvania, United States
 West Albany High School, Albany, Oregon, United States
 West Anchorage High School, Anchorage, Alaska, United States
 West Aurora High School, Aurora, Illinois, United States
 Western Alamance High School, Elon, North Carolina, United States
 Western Albemarle High School, Crozet, Virginia, United States
 William Allen High School, Allentown, Pennsylvania, United States
 Windber Area High School, Windber, Pennsylvania, United States
 Würzburg American High School, a closed United States Department of Defense Dependent School System school in Würzburg, Germany
 Wyomissing Area Junior/Senior High School, Wyomissing, Pennsylvania, United States

Other
 Jenderal Ahmad Yani International Airport (ICAO: WAHS)